In computer science, inter-process communication or interprocess communication (IPC) refers specifically to the mechanisms an operating system provides to allow the processes to manage shared data. Typically, applications can use IPC, categorized as clients and servers, where the client requests data and the server responds to client requests. Many applications are both clients and servers, as commonly seen in distributed computing.

IPC is very important to the design process for microkernels and nanokernels, which reduce the number of functionalities provided by the kernel. Those functionalities are then obtained by communicating with servers via IPC, leading to a large increase in communication when compared to a regular monolithic kernel. IPC interfaces generally encompass variable analytic framework structures. These processes ensure compatibility between the multi-vector protocols upon which IPC models rely.

An IPC mechanism is either synchronous or asynchronous. Synchronization primitives may be used to have synchronous behavior with an asynchronous IPC mechanism.

Approaches 
Different approaches to IPC have been tailored to different software requirements, such as performance, modularity, and system circumstances such as network bandwidth and latency.

Applications

Remote procedure call interfaces 

 Java's Remote Method Invocation (RMI)
 ONC RPC
 XML-RPC or SOAP
 JSON-RPC
 Message Bus (Mbus) (specified in RFC 3259) (not to be confused with M-Bus)
 .NET Remoting
gRPC

Platform communication stack 
The following are messaging, and information systems that utilize IPC mechanisms but don't implement IPC themselves:

 KDE's Desktop Communications Protocol (DCOP) deprecated by D-Bus
 D-Bus
 OpenWrt uses ubus micro bus architecture
 MCAPI Multicore Communications API
 SIMPL The Synchronous Interprocess Messaging Project for Linux (SIMPL)
 9P (Plan 9 Filesystem Protocol)
 Distributed Computing Environment (DCE)
 Thrift
 ZeroC's Internet Communications Engine (ICE)
 ØMQ
 Enduro/X Middleware
 YAMI4
 Enlightenment_(software) E16 uses eesh as an IPC

Operating system communication stack 
The following are platform or programming language-specific APIs:

 Apple Computer's Apple events, previously known as Interapplication Communications (IAC)
 ARexx ports
 Enea's LINX for Linux (open source) and various DSP and general-purpose processors under OSE
 The Mach kernel's Mach Ports
 Microsoft's ActiveX, Component Object Model (COM), Microsoft Transaction Server (COM+), Distributed Component Object Model (DCOM), Dynamic Data Exchange (DDE), Object Linking and Embedding (OLE), anonymous pipes, named pipes, Local Procedure Call, MailSlots, Message loop, MSRPC, .NET Remoting, and Windows Communication Foundation (WCF)
 Novell's SPX
 POSIX mmap, message queues, semaphores, and shared memory
 RISC OS's messages
 Solaris Doors
 System V's message queues, semaphores, and shared memory
 Linux Transparent Inter Process Communication (TIPC)
 OpenBinder Open binder
 QNX's PPS (Persistent Publish/Subscribe) service

Distributed object models 
The following are platform or programming language specific-APIs that use IPC, but do not themselves implement it:

 Libt2n for C++ under Linux only, handles complex objects and exceptions
 PHP's sessions
 Distributed Ruby
 Common Object Request Broker Architecture (CORBA)
 Electron's asynchronous IPC, shares JSON objects between a main and a renderer process

See also 

 Computer network programming
 Communicating Sequential Processes (CSP paradigm)
 Data Distribution Service
 Protected procedure call

References 

 Stevens, Richard. UNIX Network Programming, Volume 2, Second Edition: Interprocess Communications. Prentice Hall, 1999. 
 U. Ramachandran, M. Solomon, M. Vernon Hardware support for interprocess communication Proceedings of the 14th annual international symposium on Computer architecture. Pittsburgh, Pennsylvania, United States. Pages: 178 - 188. Year of Publication: 1987 
 Crovella, M. Bianchini, R. LeBlanc, T. Markatos, E. Wisniewski, R. Using communication-to-computation ratio in parallel program designand performance prediction 1–4 December 1992. pp. 238–245

External links 
 Linux ipc(5) man page describing System V IPC
 Windows IPC
 IPC available using Qt
 Unix Network Programming (Vol 2: Interprocess Communications) by W. Richard Stevens
 Interprocess Communication and Pipes in C
 DIPC, Distributed System V IPC